Kenny Lego Gillet (born 3 January 1986 in Bordeaux, France) is a French footballer who plays as a left-back. He previously played for SM Caen, Barnet, Inverness Caledonian Thistle, AEK Larnaca, Nea Salamis Famagusta and Oissel.

Career
He was released in the summer of 2007 and after a successful trial with Barnet he signed for the club on 24 August. On 2 June 2010, it was announced on the club website that Gillet had been released by Barnet. Later in the month he rejected a contract offer from new manager Mark Stimson.

In July 2010, Gillet went on trial with Leyton Orient, and later in the month joined Inverness Caledonian Thistle. Kenny was part of the Inverness team that beat Celtic 3-2 on 4 May 2011. Gillet signed for Cypriot club AEK Larnaca in July 2012.

References

External links

 Profile on Sky Sports
 Barnet F.C.'s profile

 Foot National

1986 births
Footballers from Bordeaux
Living people
Association football fullbacks
French footballers
French expatriate footballers
AS Cannes players
Stade Malherbe Caen players
Barnet F.C. players
Inverness Caledonian Thistle F.C. players
English Football League players
Scottish Premier League players
Cypriot First Division players
AEK Larnaca FC players
Nea Salamis Famagusta FC players
CMS Oissel players
Expatriate footballers in England
Expatriate footballers in Scotland
Expatriate footballers in Cyprus